Eric Holroyd (24 July 1905 – 1987) was an English footballer who played as a winger for Rochdale. He also played non-league football for various other clubs.

References

Rochdale A.F.C. players
Footballers from Rochdale
English footballers
1905 births
1987 deaths
Association footballers not categorized by position